Vasilios Soulis (born 7 December 1994) is a Greek professional footballer who plays as a goalkeeper for Super League club PAS Giannina.

References

1994 births
Living people
Greek footballers
Football League (Greece) players
Super League Greece players
Gamma Ethniki players
Super League Greece 2 players
Panachaiki F.C. players
Platanias F.C. players
PAS Giannina F.C. players
Association football goalkeepers
Footballers from Patras